Boccia at the 2012 Summer Paralympics was held in the ExCeL from 2 September to 8 September, with a maximum of 104 athletes (80 men, 24 women) competing in seven events. There were four individual events, two pair events, and one team event.

Classification
When competing in boccia at national or international level, the athletes were competing in events with different classifications, based on level of physical disability.

 BC1 - Cerebral palsy.
Locomotor dysfunction affecting the whole body.
Use hands or feet to propel the ball into play
May be assisted by an aide.
 BC2 - Cerebral palsy.
Locomotor dysfunction affecting the whole body
Use hands to propel the ball into play
Not assisted by an aide.
 BC3 - Cerebral palsy or another disability.
Locomotor dysfunction in all four limbs.
Use the help of a ramp to propel the ball into play.
Assisted by an aide (ramper).
 BC4 - Not cerebral palsy, but another disability, for example muscular dystrophy or tetraplegia.
Locomotor dysfunction in all four limbs
Use hands to propel the ball into play
Not assisted by an aide.

Events

 Mixed

 Individual
 BC1
 BC2
 BC3
 BC4

 Team
 BC1/BC2

 Pairs
 BC3
 BC4

Qualification
The athlete quota for boccia is 104 athletes, 80 men and 24 women. Each National Paralympic Committee (NPC) can have up to a maximum of nine athletes (one team of four, one pair of three, and one pair of two) in team and pair events, and 12 in individual events. Athletes must be on the CPISRA Boccia Individual World Ranking List, to be eligible for selection. Athletes who wish to qualify for the Paralympics need to be on the ranking list closing 31 December 2011.

Qualification timeline

Qualified teams

Participating nations 
103 competitors from 21 nations competed.

Medal summary

Medal table

Medalists

References

External links
- Rankings at CPISRA

 
2012
2012 Summer Paralympics events
2012 in bowls